In philosophy, metaphysical necessity, sometimes called broad logical necessity, is one of many different kinds of necessity, which sits between logical necessity and nomological (or physical) necessity, in the sense that logical necessity entails metaphysical necessity, but not vice versa, and metaphysical necessity entails physical necessity, but not vice versa.  A proposition is said to be necessary if it could not have failed to be the case.  Nomological necessity is necessity according to the laws of physics and logical necessity is necessity according to the laws of logic, while metaphysical necessities are necessary in the sense that the world could not possibly have been otherwise.  What facts are metaphysically necessary, and on what basis we might view certain facts as metaphysically but not logically necessary are subjects of substantial discussion in contemporary philosophy.

The concept of a metaphysically necessary being plays an important role in certain arguments for the existence of God, especially the ontological argument, but metaphysical necessity is also one of the central concepts in late 20th century analytic philosophy.  Metaphysical necessity has proved a controversial concept, and criticized by David Hume, Immanuel Kant, J. L. Mackie, and Richard Swinburne, among others.

Types of necessity 
Metaphysical necessity is contrasted with other types of necessity.  For example, the philosophers of religion John Hick and William L. Rowe distinguished the following three:
 factual necessity (existential necessity): a factually necessary being is not causally dependent on any other being, while any other being is causally dependent on it.
 causal necessity (subsumed by Hick under the former type): a causally necessary being is such that it is logically impossible for it to be causally dependent on any other being, and it is logically impossible for any other being to be causally independent of it.
 logical necessity: a logically necessary being is a being whose non-existence is a logical impossibility, and which therefore exists either timeless or eternally in all possible worlds.

Hume's dictum 
Hume's dictum is a thesis about necessary connections between distinct entities. Its original formulation can be found in David Hume's A Treatise of Human Nature: "There is no object, which implies the existence of any other if we consider these objects in themselves". Hume's intuition motivating this thesis is that while experience presents us with certain ideas of various objects, it might as well have presented us with very different ideas. So when I perceive a bird on a tree, I might as well have perceived a bird without a tree or a tree without a bird. This is so because their essences do not depend upon another. David Lewis follows this line of thought in formulating his principle of recombination: "anything can coexist with anything else, at least provided they occupy distinct spatiotemporal positions. Likewise, anything can fail to coexist with anything else".

Hume's dictum has been employed in various arguments in contemporary metaphysics. It can be used, for example, as an argument against nomological necessitarianism, the view that the laws of nature are necessary, i.e. are the same in all possible worlds. To see how this might work, consider the case of salt being thrown into a cup of water and subsequently dissolving. This can be described as a series of two events, a throwing-event and a dissolving-event. Necessitarians hold that all possible worlds with the throwing-event also contain a subsequent dissolving-event. But the two events are distinct entities, so according to Hume's dictum, it is possible to have one event without the other. An even wider application is to use Hume's dictum as an axiom of modality to determine which propositions or worlds are possible based on the notion of recombination.

A posteriori and necessary truths  
In Naming and Necessity, Saul Kripke argued that there were a posteriori truths, such as "Hesperus is Phosphoros", or "Water is H2O", that were nonetheless metaphysically necessary.

Necessity in theology 
While many theologians (e.g. Anselm of Canterbury, René Descartes, and Gottfried Leibniz) considered God to be a logically or metaphysically necessary being, Richard Swinburne argued for factual necessity, and Alvin Plantinga argues that God is a causally necessary being. Because a factually or causally necessary being does not exist by logical necessity, it does not exist in all logically possible worlds. Therefore, Swinburne used the term "ultimate brute fact" for the existence of God.

See also
 Ananke
 Modal logic
 Platonism
 A priori and a posteriori

References

External links
 
 http://www.philosophyonline.co.uk/oldsite/tok/rationalism5.htm
 Modal Metaphysics article in the Internet Encyclopedia of Philosophy
 Modal Illusions article in the Internet Encyclopedia of Philosophy

Necessity
Reality